Thomas Cafego (August 21, 1911 – October 29, 1961) was an outfielder in Major League Baseball. He played for the St. Louis Browns in 1937.

References

External links

1911 births
1961 deaths
Major League Baseball outfielders
St. Louis Browns players
Baseball players from West Virginia